The Allahabad–Jabalpur section is a railway line connecting Prayagraj and Jabalpur. This  track is part of the Howrah–Allahabad–Mumbai line. The main line is under the jurisdiction of North Central Railway  and West Central Railway

History
The East Indian Railway, which had established the Howrah–Delhi main line via Allahabad, opened the Allahabad–Jabalpur branch line in June 1867. The Great Indian Peninsula Railway connection reached Jabalpur from Itarsi on 7 March 1870,  linking up with the EIR track there from Allahabad, and establishing connectivity between Mumbai and Kolkata.

The Jhansi–Manikpur line was opened in 1889 by Indian Midland Railway.

The Mahoba–Khajuraho branch line was inaugurated in 2008.

Electrification
Prayagraj to Jabalpur section is completely electrified

Speed limits
The Allahabad–Bhusawal section is classified as 'B' class where trains can run up to 130 km/h. On the branch lines trains can run up to 100 km/h.

Passenger movement
Allahabad, Katni  and Jabalpur, on the main line are amongst the top hundred booking stations of Indian Railway.

Loco sheds
The former has WDM-2, WDM-3A, WDG-3A, WDG-4, WDG-4D and the only WDG-3C "Cheetah" diesel locomotives. The latter holds 170+ WAG-5 and WAG-7 electric locomotives and has a large marshalling yard attached to it.

References

External links
 Trains at Allahabad
 Trains at Manikpur
 Trains at Satna
 Trains at Jabalpur
 Trains at Katni
 Trains at Katni South
 Trains at Katni Murwara

5 ft 6 in gauge railways in India
Railway lines in Uttar Pradesh
Rail transport in Madhya Pradesh
Railway lines opened in 1867
Transport in Jabalpur
Transport in Allahabad district